Gabriel Gbadamosi (born 1961) is a British poet, playwright and novelist of Irish-Nigerian descent. He is founding editor of the online literary platform WritersMosaic, an initiative of The Royal Literary Fund.

Biography
Gbadamosi was born in London, where he grew up in Vauxhall. He studied English at Cambridge University, earning a BA (Hons) degree.

He held an AHRC Creative and Performing Arts Fellowship at Goldsmiths, University of London 2006–2009, based in the Department of Theatre and Performance and researching with the Pinter Centre for Performance and Creative Writing. He has also lectured in dramaturgy at the University of Istanbul, has been Judith E. Wilson Fellow at the Faculty of English of Cambridge University, director of the Society of Authors, and a presenter of BBC Radio 3's arts programme Night Waves.

Writing 
Gbadamosi's poems have featured in such anthologies as The New Poetry 1968–1988 (1988) and The Heinemann Book of African Poetry in English (1990), and his plays include No Blacks, No Irish, Eshu's Faust (Jesus College, Cambridge), Shango (DNA, Amsterdam), Hotel Orpheu (Schaubühne, Berlin), Friday's Daughter (for television), as well as the BBC Radio 3 drama about the Notting Hill Carnival entitled The Long, Hot Summer of '76, which won the first Richard Imison Memorial Award. His most recent play Stop and Search was staged at the Arcola Theatre in 2019, directed by Mehmet Ergen.

His first published novel, Vauxhall (2013, Telegram Books), described by The Spectators reviewer as "a book of rare poetic insight and humour that absorbs from start to finish", won the Tibor Jones Pageturner Prize and Best International Novel at the Sharjah Book Fair.

Other activities 
In August 2013, Gbadamosi appeared on BBC Radio 4's Great Lives, nominating Nigerian musician Fela Kuti.

Gbadamosi has been a judge for literary prizes including the EBRD Literature Prize, and has been director of Wasafiri magazine and a trustee of the Arcola Theatre.

Gbadamosi is founding editor of Writers Mosaic, an initiative of the Royal Literary Fund that is an online platform to showcase original writing from both new and established writers.

Selected bibliography
 Vauxhall, Telegram Books, 2013, . French translation by Elizabeth Gilles, Editions Zoé, 2015, 
 Stop and Search, Oberon Books/Bloomsbury Publishing, 2019,

References

External links
 Official website
 Kaite O'Reilly, "20 Questions… Gabriel Gbadamosi", 8 May 2013.

1961 births
21st-century British novelists
Living people
Alumni of the University of Cambridge
Black British writers
British poets
British dramatists and playwrights
English people of Nigerian descent
English people of Irish descent